Conus fergusoni, common name the Ferguson's cone, is a species of sea snail, a marine gastropod mollusk in the family Conidae, the cone snails and their allies.

Like all species within the genus Conus, these snails are predatory and venomous. They are capable of "stinging" humans, therefore live ones should be handled carefully or not at all.

Description
The size of an adult shell varies between 60 mm and 150 mm. The heavy shell has a slightly channeled spire. The white shell is lightly striolate transversely and is covered under a brown epidermis.

Distribution
This species occurs in the Pacific Ocean off the Galapagos Islands and from the Gulf of California to Peru.

References

 Filmer R.M. (2001). A Catalogue of Nomenclature and Taxonomy in the Living Conidae 1758–1998. Backhuys Publishers, Leiden. 388pp.
 Tucker J.K. (2009). Recent cone species database. 4 September 2009 Edition
 Petit, R. E. (2009), George Brettingham Sowerby, I, II & III: their conchological publications and molluscan taxa. Zootaxa. 2189: 1–218

External links
 The Conus Biodiversity website
 
 Cone Shells – Knights of the Sea

Gallery

fergusoni
Gastropods described in 1873